= Caur ērkšķiem uz... =

Latvian reality television series

- Genre: Reality television
- Presented by: Jānis Bukums
- Country of origin: Latvia
- Original language: Latvian
- No. of seasons: 7
- No. of episodes: 102

Production
- Producer: Aija Strazdiņa‑Ratinska

Original release
- Network: 360TV, TetTV+ , STV Pirmā! , 1188.play.
- Release: 2017 – 2025

Caur ērkšķiem uz... is a Latvian 7 series long social television project and reality TV series that premiered in 2017 and has since been broadcast in multiple seasons on channels STV Pirmā!, 360TV and streaming platforms Tet TV+ and 1188.play. The show features groups of women who have faced significant life challenges such as addiction, domestic violence, legal issues, or loss of custody and follows their efforts to transform their lives through guided support, professional mentoring, and personal development activities. The series is produced by Latvian TV producer Aija Strazdiņa‑Ratinska, with longtime host Jānis Bukums and, in later seasons, co‑host Ieva Brante. Over its run, Caur ērkšķiem uz... has attracted attention for its candid portrayal of social issues affecting women in Latvia such as domestic violence, poverty and has become a recurring topic in media.

== Concept ==
Caur ērkšķiem uz... is a Latvian reality television series that focuses on the rehabilitation and personal transformation of socially vulnerable women. Each season follows a group of women facing serious life challenges, such as addiction, domestic violence, homelessness, unemployment, or strained family relationships. Over the course of the project, participants live together in a structured environment where they receive professional psychological support, social rehabilitation assistance, and practical life-skills training.

Participants take part in therapy sessions, group discussions, work assignments, and personal development tasks designed to foster accountability, emotional growth, and independence. Progress is documented through interviews, observational footage, and reflective segments, allowing viewers to follow each woman's personal journey.

== Cast ==
In the 7 series long TV project, each season of Caur ērkšķiem uz... features a new group of women who volunteer to take part in the social rehabilitation project. The cast changes every season, with no recurring main participants, as the format centers on documenting real-life transformation journeys.

Season 1 cast

- Daiga (42 years old)
- Laura (23 years old)
- Alla (31 years old)
- Deivija (31 years old)
- Linda (47 years old)
- Inga (51 years old)
- Krista (21 years old)
- Inese (35 years old)
- Sintija (26 years old)
- Laima (22 years old)

Season 2 cast

- Alīna (26 years old)
- Anete (23 years old)
- Inese (41 years old)
- Inita (31 years old)
- Liene (25 years old)
- Lolita (62 years old)
- Monika (33 years old)
- Solvita (33 years old)
- Una (26 years old)
- Viktorija (26 years old)

Season 3 cast

- Marija (19 years old)
- Laila (28 years old)
- Laila (19 years old)
- Lāsma (34 years old)
- Aiva (23 years old)
- Olga (19 years old)
- Elvija (20 years old)
- Līga (36 years old)
- Kristīne (33 years old)
- Mārīte (41 years old)
- Andželika (23 years old)

Season 4 cast

- Laura (28 years old)
- Kristīne (25 years old)
- Līga/Markuss (24 years old)
- Ina (44 years old)
- Inga (32 years old)
- Sarmīte (29 years old)
- Anželika (30 years old)
- Ināra (22 years old)
- Ginta (28 years old)
- Nataļja (32 years old)

Season 5 cast

- Anastasija (39 years old)
- Madara (24 years old)
- Ieva (28 years old)
- Kristīne (28 years old)
- Lilita (19 years old)
- Katrīna (21 years old)
- Zeltīte (35 years old)
- Elīna (37 years old)
- Marija (27 years old)
- Gunita (28 years old)
- Diāna (35 years old)

Season 6 cast

- Monika (29 years old)
- Santa (28 years old)
- Elīna (18 years old)
- Ieva (26 years old)
- Inga (40 years old)
- Vika (18 years old)
- Iļjana (30 years old)
- Diāna (32 years old)
- Viktorija (33 years old)
- Laura (40 years old)

Season 7 cast

- Laura (32 years old)
- Jana (32 years old)
- Evita (40 years old)
- Elīne (28 years old)
- Ksenija (37 years old)
- Olga (29 years old)
- Inese (28 years old)
- Ilze (37 years old)
- Dace (29 years old)
- Egija (40 years old)

== Production ==
Caur ērkšķiem uz... is produced by Latvian media production company SIA Jump Studio, led by television producer Aija Strazdiņa-Ratinska. The series is produced by Latvian TV producer Aija Strazdiņa‑Ratinska, with longtime host Jānis Bukums and, in later seasons, co‑host Ieva Brante. Filming typically begins several months before the broadcast season. For example, production of the seventh season commenced with an official launch event in May 2025, where participants were introduced to each other and to the show's hosts, and the crew outlined the journey ahead. The format emphasizes unscripted, authentic interactions and situations, and the producers have described the project as an effort to authentically portray participants’ struggles and efforts at self-improvement.

The series is commissioned by television broadcaster Kanāls 360 and distributed through both traditional broadcast and the Tet TV+ platform.

== Episodes ==
Season	Number of episodes
1	12
2	14
3	14
4	14
5	20
6	14
7	14
